Bogomil (Cyrillic: Богомил, also Bogumił in Polish, Bohumil in Czech and Slovak) is a Bulgarian given name of Slavic origin. It is composed of the Slavic words 'bog' (god) and 'mil' (dear) and means 'Dear to God'. 
Its feminine equivalents are Bogomila, Bogumiła, Bohumila. The sound change of 'g' > 'h' occurred in Ukrainian, Belarusian, Czech and Slovak. 

Similar names include Latin Amadeus, Greek Theophil and German Gottlieb. 

The name may refer to:

People
Bogomil (priest), medieval Bulgarian monk, founder of the Gnostic sect known as Bogomilism
blessed Bogumilus (Bogumił) (died 1182 or 1204), archbishop of Gniezno and hermit
Bogomil Avramov, Bulgarian writer
Bogumil Dawison, German actor
Bogomil Dyakov, Bulgarian footballer
Bogomil Gjuzel, Macedonian writer
Bogumił (Archbishop of Gniezno) (died 1092)
Bogumil Goltz, German humorist and satirist
Bogumił Grott, Polish historian, lecturer and professor at the Institute of Religious Studies of Jagiellonian University in Kraków
Bohumil Hrabal, Czech writer
Bogumił Kobiela, Polish film actor
Bogumiła Lisocka-Jaegermann, Polish social scientist and writer, specialising in the fields of history and development of the Third World and developing countries
Bogumil Vošnjak, Slovenian liberal politician

Fictional characters
Lieutenant Andrew Bogomil in Beverly Hills Cop

External links
Behind the Name: Meaning, Origin and History of the Name Bogumił

Slavic masculine given names
Bulgarian masculine given names
Czech masculine given names
Slovene masculine given names
Polish masculine given names
Theophoric names